Brocard's problem is a problem in mathematics that seeks integer values of  such that  is a perfect square, where  is the factorial.

More formally, it seeks pairs of integers  and  such thatThe problem was posed by Henri Brocard in a pair of articles in 1876 and 1885, and independently in 1913 by Srinivasa Ramanujan.

Brown numbers
Pairs of the numbers  that solve Brocard's problem were named Brown numbers by Clifford A. Pickover in his 1995 book Keys to Infinity, after learning of the problem from Kevin S. Brown. As of October 2022, there are only three known pairs of Brown numbers:

based on the equalities

Paul Erdős conjectured that no other solutions exist. Computational searches up to one quadrillion have found no further solutions.

Connection to the abc conjecture
It would follow from the abc conjecture that there are only finitely many Brown numbers.
More generally, it would also follow from the abc conjecture that

has only finitely many solutions, for any given integer , and that

has only finitely many integer solutions, for any given polynomial  of degree at least 2 with integer coefficients.

References

Further reading

External links
 
 

Diophantine equations
Srinivasa Ramanujan
Unsolved problems in number theory
Factorial and binomial topics